Selimcan Temel (born 27 May 2000) is a Turkish professional footballer who plays as a defensive midfielder for Fethiyespor on loan from the Süper Lig club Hatayspor.

Career
Temel began his senior career with İnegölspor in the TFF First League, playing with them 78 times in the league. He transferred to the Süper Lig club Hatayspor on 19 January 2022. He made his professional debut with Hatayspor in a 2–0 Süper Lig loss to Fenerbahçe on 20 February 2022.

References

External links
 
 

2000 births
Living people
Sportspeople from Bursa
Turkish footballers
Association football midfielders
Hatayspor footballers
Fethiyespor footballers
Süper Lig players
TFF Second League players